Paul Horst-Schulze (5 October 1876 – 27 December 1937) was a German painter, graphic artist and artisan. His stage name Horst-Schulze came about by combining his middle name with his original family name.

Life 
Born in Naunhof, Horst-Schulze was a son of the Naunhofer pastor Moritz Hermann Schulze (1828-1909). At the age of seven, he suffered a serious back injury when he fell from a tree. Since he concealed the accident out of fear of his father, without medical treatment his back became so deformed that he had a hump for the rest of his life. At that time, this was a reason not to take up the training as a pastor that his father was aiming for. Instead, he studied at the Hochschule für Grafik und Buchkunst Leipzig from 1891 and at the Akademie der Bildenden Künste München from 1894, as well as one year at the Kunstakademie Düsseldorf. When he returned to Leipzig at the beginning of the 20th century, he was considered one of the most talented young Leipzig artists.

For the church, which was built from 1901 to 1904 according to plans by the architect Raymund Brachmann (1872-1953) for the merchant Max Haunstein, he created the interior design of one of the most beautiful Jugendstil villas in Leipzig.

He designed many illustrations as well as book decorations for children's and youth publications, especially for the publishing house of Eugen Diederichs (1867–1930). His first paintings were shown at the 1903 Saxon Art Exhibition in Dresden and in 1904 at the House of the Berlin Secession, as well as in 1909 at the collective exhibition of the Leipzig Artists' Association.

In 1904 Horst-Schulze obtained a teaching post at what was now the Royal Academy for Graphic Arts and Book Trade in Leipzig, which was converted into a professorship in figurative painting in 1911. This appointment enabled him to start a family, and he married Wera Wagner in 1907. The couple moved into the newly built Märchenhaus on today's , which was destroyed during the Second World War. Both were friends with the painter and sculptor Max Klinger (1857–1920).

in 1907, Horst-Schulze was one of the first members of the Deutscher Werkbund and founded the Saxon section of the federation together with Raymund Brachmann. He was also a member of the Deutscher Künstlerbund, the Leipziger Künstlerbund and the Leipziger Jahresausstellung association.

Schulze died Leipzig at the age of 61.

Work (selection) 
 1901: Ausgestaltung der Gnadenkirche in Leipzig-Wahren
 1901–1904: Ausstattung der Villa Haunstein, among others Wandbild Die Heimkehr aus dem Sagenkreis um König Rother
 1908: Porträt des Leipziger Oberbürgermeisters Otto Georgi (1831–1918)
 1909: Sonnenstudie Wera in Grün, oil on canvas
 1909: Wandbild in Auerbachs Keller
 1913: Sommertag in der Provence, oil on canvas
 1918: Schiller, Strichätzung 1918
 1920: Mutter und Kind, oil on wood
 1920: Arbeiter, Pinsel- und Federzeichnung in schwarzer Tusche
 1920: Max Klinger auf dem Totenbett, lithography
 1921: Blick auf das Saaletal von Max Klingers Besitzungen aus, oil on canvas
 1924/25: Wandgemälde Die Verherrlichung der Fröbelschen Menschenerziehung in der ehemaligen  in der Goldschmidtstraße. Zuvor Vorstudie als Gouache. Wandbild übermalt, soll wieder freigelegt werden.
 1930: Sommerblumenstrauß in einer Vase, oil on wood

Further reading 
 Hans-Werner Schmidt (ed.): Kopf oder Zahl. Leipziger Gesichter und Geschichten 1858–2008. (Katalog anlässlich der Jubiläumsausstellung im Museum der bildenden Künste Leipzig vom 9. November 2008 bis 8 February 2009), E. A. Seemann, Leipzig 2008, Kat. 1909.
 Andreas Höhn: Werkbundgründer und Expressionist. Der Maler Paul Horst-Schulze. In: Leipziger Blätter. 2006, issue 49, .
 Horst-Schulze, Paul. In Hans Vollmer (ed.): Allgemeines Lexikon der bildenden Künstler des XX. Jahrhunderts. Volume 2: E–J. E. A. Seemann, Leipzig 1955, .

References

External links 
 

 Example of a book illustration: Bilder zu Gedichten von Joseph von Eichendorff

19th-century German painters
19th-century German male artists
1876 births
1937 deaths
People from Leipzig (district)
20th-century German painters
20th-century German male artists